The New Zealand king shag (Leucocarbo carunculatus), also known as the rough-faced shag, king shag or kawau, is a rare bird endemic to New Zealand. Some taxonomic authorities, including the International Ornithologists' Union, place this species in the genus Leucocarbo. Others place it in the genus Phalacrocorax.

Taxonomy
The New Zealand king shag was formally described in 1789 by the German naturalist Johann Friedrich Gmelin in his revised and expanded edition of Carl Linnaeus's Systema Naturae. He placed it in the genus Pelecanus and coined the binomial name Pelecanus carunculatus. Gmelin based his description on the "carunculated shag" that had been described in 1785 by the English ornithologist John Latham in his book A General Synopsis of Birds . Latham had based his description on a specimen in the Leverian Museum. The New Zealand king shag is now one of 16 species placed in the genus Leucocarbo that was introduced in 1856 by the French naturalist Charles Lucien Bonaparte. The name Leucocarbo combines the Ancient Greek leukos meaning "white" with the genus name Carbo introduced by Bernard Germain de Lacépède in 1799. The specific epithet is from Latin caruncula  meaning "small piece of flesh". The species is monotypic: no subspecies are recognised.

Description 

It is a large (76 cm long, 2.5 kg in weight) black and white cormorant with pink feet. White patches on the wings appear as bars when the wings are folded. Yellow-orange swellings (caruncles) are found above the base of the bill. The grey gular pouch is reddish in the breeding season. A blue eye-ring indicates its kinship with the other blue-eyed shags.

Distribution and habitat 
New Zealand king shags can be seen from the Cook Strait ferries in Queen Charlotte Sound opposite the beginning of the Tory Channel. They live in the coastal waters of the Marlborough Sounds where they are known to breed only on rocky islets at four small sites.

References

External links 
 Image and Classification at Animal Diversity Web

New Zealand king shag
Endemic birds of New Zealand
Vulnerable fauna of Oceania
Marlborough Sounds
New Zealand king shag
New Zealand king shag